Lyubov Mykhailivna Panchenko (2 February 1938 – 30 April 2022) was a Ukrainian visual artist and fashion designer. She was a member of the Ukrainian Women's Union. She belonged to the Sixtiers, a group of artists of the sixties who revived Ukrainian culture during the Khrushchev Thaw.

Life 
Lyubov was born on 2 February 1938 in the village of Yablunka. In the late 1950s she graduated from the Kyiv School of Applied Arts (embroidery department). Later, she worked in a tailoring workshop and at the same time expanded her horizons of knowledge of art, becoming interested in linocut. In 1968 she entered the evening department of the Faculty of Graphics of the Ukrainian Academy of Printing.

Panchenko worked at the Design and Engineering Technological Institute as a fashion designer and at the Republican House of Models. At that time, her bright talent flourished: she created a series of watercolors, clothing models, embroidery patterns, graphic screensavers for books, paintings. Many of her embroidery works were showcased in the magazine "Soviet Woman".

She was known to have defended the Ukrainian language and culture. She painted pysanka Easter eggs, embroidered national costumes for choirs, and raised money to help political prisoners serving sentences for "anti-Soviet agitation and propaganda." With her participation, the tradition of koliadka caroling and vertep nativity scenes was revived in Kyiv.

Panchenko was awarded the Vasyl Stus Prize in 2001.

Because of the evident Ukrainian folk inspirations in her work, she never had an exhibition during the Soviet era. She relied financially on her fashion work and embroidery.

Panchenko died in the town of Bucha on 30 April 2022, at the age of 84. It was reported that she died of starvation caused by the 2022 Russian invasion of Ukraine.

Exhibitions 
In 2008, the National Museum of Literature of Ukraine exhibited the anniversary exhibition of Lyubov Panchenko. Yevhen Sverstiuk, a human rights activist and poet at the time, remarked: “These works clearly bear the stamp of genius. She lives in her world, she opens this world to us."

(«Світе мій!»).

References

Literature 
 Любов Панченко: повернення: альбом / передм. Олена Лодзинська, Василь Перевальський, Діана Клочко ; упорядн. Олена Лодзинська, Любов Крупник ; переклад на англ. Ольга Грабар, Соломія Джаман, Олексій Плохотюк ; дизайн Олексій Чекаль. — Київ-Харків: Видавець Олександр Савчук, 2021. — 256 с., 270 іл. —

External links 
 Website dedicated to Panchenko in English language

1938 births
2022 deaths
Ukrainian Academy of Printing alumni
Recipients of the Vasyl Stus Prize
Ukrainian artists
People from Bucha, Kyiv Oblast
People killed in the 2022 Russian invasion of Ukraine
Civilians killed in the Russian invasion of Ukraine
Ukrainian embroiderers